Stefano Rossini (born 2 February 1971) is an Italian football manager and former player, who played as a defender for numerous Italian clubs throughout his career. He is the manager of Serie D club Vigor Carpaneto.

Club career

Parma & Inter
Rossini started his career at Parma, who were at that time in Serie B. He joined Italian giant Internazionale in summer 1989, but after a poor season, he left for AC Fiorentina. He made no appearance for La Viola and left for his mother club Parma in November 1990 for their first ever Serie A season.

Between Serie A bottom clubs
In the next season, he left for Udinese, where he won Serie A promotion after finishing fourth in Serie B. He moved back to Internazionale in 1992–93 season, but just played four games, including one in Coppa Italia.

He moved back to Udinese in 1993–94 season, where the club were relegated back to Serie B at the end of season.

Rossini joined Piacenza in the summer of 1994, where he again won promotion to Serie A after finishing 1st in Serie B. After Piacenza finished just above the relegated clubs in 1995–96 season, he left for Atalanta, who finished just above Piacenza in that season.

Rossini played with Atalanta until November 1997, when he left for newly promoted Serie A team Lecce. Lecce finished second from bottom and were relegated.

After playing once in Serie B for Lecce during the 1998–99 season, he left for Genoa C.F.C. of Serie B in October 1998.

Genoa & Serie B
Rossini played with Genoa from 1998 until 2001, then spent a season at Ternana in Serie B in 2001–02 season. He returned to Genoa for the start of the 2002–03 season. In summer 2003, he joined Como, but Como finished bottom and were relegated to Serie C1. After six months without a club, he joined Cremonese of Serie C1 in January 2005, and won promotion to Serie B after finishing as champions. Cremonese were subsequently relegated in summer 2006.

Late career
Rossini joined Reggiana of Serie C2 in summer 2006. In January 2008, after spending 6 months unattached, he signed for Pizzighettone. He left the club at the end of the season, joining Fidenza in Serie D.

International career
Rossini was a member of the Italian Olympic football team at the 1992 Summer Olympics.

Coaching career
After retiring, Rossini was hired as a youth coach at Pavia. He was appointed as caretaker manager two times for the first team of Pavia, first time on 13 December 2015 and three days forward, and the second time from March 2016 until the end of the season. Rossini then left the club at the end of the 2015–16 season.

On 5 October 2017, Rossini was appointed as manager of ASD Vigor Carpaneto. He was fired from his position on 5 March 2019. On 7 October 2019, he was hired by Vigor Carpaneto once again.

References

External links
 

1971 births
Living people
Sportspeople from the Province of Mantua
Association football defenders
Italian footballers
Olympic footballers of Italy
Italy under-21 international footballers
Footballers at the 1992 Summer Olympics
Parma Calcio 1913 players
Inter Milan players
Udinese Calcio players
Piacenza Calcio 1919 players
Atalanta B.C. players
U.S. Lecce players
Genoa C.F.C. players
Ternana Calcio players
Como 1907 players
U.S. Cremonese players
A.C. Reggiana 1919 players
A.S. Pizzighettone players
Serie A players
Serie B players
Serie C players
Italy B international footballers
Italian football managers
Footballers from Lombardy